OMNOVA Solutions Inc., is a global manufacturer of laminates, performance films and coated fabrics. OMNOVA was founded in 1999 when GenCorp spun off its Decorative & Building Products and Performance Chemicals businesses into a separate, publicly traded company. OMNOVA's world headquarters is located in Beachwood, Ohio  with additional sales, manufacturing and distribution locations throughout Europe and Asia.

Products
OMNOVA produces a variety of products within two Business Units - Performance Chemicals and Engineered Surfaces. The Engineered Surfaces business the following divisions: Performance Chemicals, Pool Liner Films, Performance Films, Laminates, viewnique Digital Murals and Upholstery.

Performance Chemicals
According to OMNOVA's webpage, the Performance Chemicals business makes up about 75% of the Company's revenues.  Emulsion polymers and specialty chemicals are key ingredients in products for a wide variety of end uses including architectural and industrial coatings; nonwovens used in hygiene products, filtration and construction; drilling additives for oil and gas exploration and production; elastomeric modification of plastic casings and hoses used in household and industrial products and automobiles; floor polishes and sealers; tire cord and other fabric reinforced rubber goods; molded rubber components; tapes and adhesives; sports surfaces; textile finishes; carpet backing; coated paper and packaging; and the list goes on.

The performance features of end use products that incorporate OMNOVA chemicals include stain, rust and aging resistance; surface modification; gloss; softness or hardness; dimensional stability; high heat and pressure tolerance; binding and barrier (e.g. moisture, oil) properties, and others.

Engineered Surfaces
OMNOVA's Engineered Surfaces business comprises the remaining 25% of the company's sales. Laminates, coated fabrics and films are primarily rolled goods (and occasionally sheets) of vinyl, polyurethane or paper. Superior durability, cleanability, stain and chip resistance, and design flexibility are hallmarks of these products. Additionally, the Engineered Surfaces Business Unit's products include viewnique digital wall murals which can be used to create branded interior for restaurants and retail chains.

Laminates
OMNOVA's laminate portfolio includes realistic woodgrains, faux marbles and granites, contemporary patterns and solids, available in a variety of textures, colors, and surface decorative and protective finishes in a range of constructions from cost-effective Paper Laminates to high-performance 3D (thermofoil) Laminates. OMNOVA's laminates are used to fabricate retail fixtures and displays, casework for hospitality and food service; kitchen and bath cabinetry; residential and commercial furniture; recreational vehicle and manufactured housing interiors; and luxury vinyl tile flooring.

Upholstery
OMNOVA's coated fabrics are primarily used in upholstered seating as a high performance alternative to textile upholsteries, which are costly and difficult to clean. Major and emerging automotive OEMs in Asia are increasingly depending on OMNOVA’s coated fabrics to upgrade the quality of their seating. Additionally, OMNOVA's vinyl and polyurethane upholstery is used across the global transportation sector in mass transit trains and buses, heavy duty trucks and boats. OMNOVA's upholstery products are also used in various contract applications including healthcare, casinos, hospitality and corporate office.

Acquisition by Synthomer
On July 2, 2019, Synthomer announced that it was going to buy Omnova Solutions for an enterprise value of $824 million in a bid to strengthen its global position as heard from Reuters. The acquisition was completed on April 2, 2020.

References

External links
 

Chemical companies of the United States
Specialty chemical companies
Manufacturing companies based in Ohio
Beachwood, Ohio
American companies established in 1999
Companies formerly listed on the New York Stock Exchange
Chemical companies established in 1999
1999 establishments in Ohio
Corporate spin-offs
2020 mergers and acquisitions
American subsidiaries of foreign companies